Jannatabad (also Romanized as Jannatābād; also known as Kalāt-e Jadīd, Kalāteh Jadīd, Kalāteh Jadīn, Kalāteh-ye Jadīd, Kalāteh-ye Jadīn, and Kalkastūn) is a village in Naharjan Rural District, Mud District, Sarbisheh County, South Khorasan Province, Iran. At the 2006 census, its population was 44, in 12 families.

References 

Populated places in Sarbisheh County